Isobenzofuran is a bicyclic heterocycle consisting of fused cyclohexa-1,3-diene and furan rings. It is isomeric with benzofuran.

Isobenzofuran is highly reactive and rapidly polymerizes; however, it has been identified and prepared by thermolysis of suitable precursors and trapped at low temperature.

Though isobenzofuran itself is not stable, it is the parent of related stable compounds with more complex structures,  such as the hindered analogue 1,3-diphenylisobenzofuran.

References

 
Simple aromatic rings